Mark Edelson (born September 12, 1985) is an South African-American politician and attorney who is a member of the Maryland House of Delegates for District 46 in Baltimore.

Background
In 1999, Edelson's family moved from South Africa to Atlanta, Georgia, where he attended Georgia State University, where he earned degrees in philosophy and criminal justice. He moved to Baltimore in 2007 to attend the University of Maryland School of Law, earning his Juris Doctor degree in 2010. After graduating, Edelson worked for the Goldman & Goldman, P.A. law firm and became a board member of The Associated: Jewish Community Federation of Baltimore and the Baltimore Jewish Council.

In June 2015, Edelson announced that he would run for the Baltimore City Council in District 1, seeking to succeed outgoing city councilmember Jim Kraft. He ran on a platform that included creating "transit hubs" within the city and streamlining the city permitting process. Edelson came in third place in the Democratic primary with 17.3 percent of the vote.

In June 2017, Edelson was the attorney for Bikemore when the bike advocacy group filed a lawsuit against the city of Baltimore to block the demolition of protected bike lanes on Potomac Street. Circuit Court Judge Althea M. Handy halted the demolition on June 10, 2017. The lawsuit was dropped on June 28, 2017, after Baltimore Mayor Catherine Pugh pledged not to demolish the bike lanes.

In 2018, Edelson became the president of the Canton Community Association. While president, the group evaluated how to make the neighborhood more welcoming, including the removal of the statue of John O'Donnell, opposed a proposal to expand Boston Street in southeast Baltimore, and advocated for the revival of the Red Line.

In 2020, Edelson worked on the transition team for Baltimore Mayor-elect Brandon Scott, serving on its transportation and infrastructure subcommittee.

In 2022, Edelson ran for the Maryland House of Delegates in District 46, seeking to succeed outgoing state delegate Brooke Lierman. During the primary, he received endorsements from councilmember Zeke Cohen, former state delegate Carolyn J. Krysiak, and former councilmembers Jim Kraft, Ed Reisinger, and Rikki Spector. Edelson won the Democratic primary on July 19, 2022, coming in third place behind incumbents Robbyn Lewis and Luke Clippinger with 19.0 percent of the vote.

In the legislature
Edelson was sworn into the Maryland House of Delegates on January 11, 2023, with the start of the Maryland General Assembly's 445th legislative session. He is a member of the House Appropriations Committee.

Personal life
Edelson lives in the Canton neighborhood of Baltimore. He is Jewish.

Electoral history

References

External links
 

Living people
1985 births
21st-century American politicians
American people of South African-Jewish descent
Georgia State University alumni
People from Pretoria
University of Maryland Francis King Carey School of Law alumni
South African emigrants to the United States
Democratic Party members of the Maryland House of Delegates
Maryland lawyers
Lawyers from Baltimore
21st-century American lawyers